Magic Bus: The Who on Tour is a compilation album by English rock band the Who. It was released as the band's fourth album in the United States by Decca in September 1968 to capitalize on the success of their single of the same name. It is a compilation album of previously released material, and was not issued in the UK, although the album was also released at approximately the same time in Canada. It peaked at #39 on the Billboard 200.

The somewhat deceptive title implies that the songs were recorded live, but all recordings are studio tracks. The track list duplicates a few songs from the second and third US albums, but also contains single and EP tracks that were previously unavailable on a US album.

Members of the group (Pete Townshend in particular) have frequently expressed their dislike of this release. When the cover pictures were taken the group was not made aware by Decca that the shots would be used for a US album. Immediately following the modest success of this album, a similar but unrelated Who compilation, Direct Hits, was released in the UK by Track Records.

In 1974, the album was re-issued by MCA Records in the US and Canada as part of a budget priced double album set which also included the 1966 US debut The Who Sings My Generation. The reissue peaked at #185 on the Billboard 200. It was reissued on compact disc by MCA Records in the 1980s, but was not included among the remasterings that took place in the 1990s. Though out of print in the US, the 1980s CD release is still available in Canada.

Track listing
All songs written by Pete Townshend except where noted. Tracks from singles are presented in mono on the original release. Some versions of this compilation use the short mono version of the title track. Some Canadian CD reissues use the longer 4 minute plus re-channeled stereo version. Some variations occur in different countries based on successes of songs in a particular market. Most, if not all, of the songs originally recorded in mono are re-channeled on the stereo LP, and subsequent re-issues.

Personnel
The Who
Roger Daltrey – lead vocals, harmonica
Pete Townshend – backing vocals, electric guitar, acoustic guitar on "Magic Bus", lead vocals on "I Can't Reach You" and "Our Love Was, Is"
John Entwistle – bass guitar, backing vocals, lead vocal on "Doctor Doctor"
Keith Moon – drums, backing vocals, lead vocal on "Bucket T"

References

The Who compilation albums
1968 compilation albums
Decca Records compilation albums
MCA Records compilation albums